Sir Hugh Hoyles (October 17, 1814 – February 1, 1888) was a politician and lawyer who served as the third premier of the colony of Newfoundland. Hoyles was the first premier of Newfoundland to have been born in the colony, and served from 1861 to 1865. Born in St. John's, he was the son of Newman Hoyles, the first leader of the Tory Party.

Educated in Nova Scotia Hoyles trained as a lawyer and returned to St John's in 1842, quickly establishing a large and lucrative legal practice. He was eminent in the Natives' Society and the Newfoundland Church Society.

Hoyles was elected to the Assembly in 1848. He rapidly became the Conservative leader, opposing responsible government, on the grounds that the colony was not ready for it, and throwing his weight behind Bishop Feild's campaign to divide the Protestant educational grant and put Anglicans on the same footing as Catholics. This proposal alienated Methodists who thereupon voted for the Catholic Liberal Party so that, in the 1855 election, the first after responsible government, Hoyles found himself leader of the Opposition. Even though he dropped his support for Feild, and adopted a more pan-Protestant stance, he still unsuccessful in the election of 1859.

In 1861, his chance came when he was hired as a lawyer by senior judges to fight Premier John Kent's plans to reduce their salaries. When Kent accused the judges, the governor and the Conservatives of conspiracy the Governor fired Kent and appointed Hoyles as the new Premier. Hoyles' government was defeated in the legislature and had to fight an election in a highly charged sectarian atmosphere which resulted in riots and loss of life, requiring troops to be sent in, when the Conservatives narrowly won the election.

During his term as premier, he tried to cool sectarian tensions between Catholics and Protestants by inviting Catholics to join his administration and distributing all patronage fairly between religious groups. He sent delegates to the Canadian Confederation Conference at Quebec in 1864. Newfoundland had not been invited to Charlottetown. Those delegates, Ambrose Shea for the opposition, and Frederick Carter, for the government, did not have the power to negotiate.

Hoyles decided to leave office in 1865, before the crucial 1869 election which decided the fate of Confederation with Canada. He was succeeded by Sir Frederick Carter. Hoyles was appointed Chief Justice of Newfoundland, a post which he filled with great distinction. He retired to Halifax in 1880 to live with his married daughter. He died on February 1, 1888. D.W. Prowse, the nineteenth century Newfoundland historian, comments that "we are all proud of Sir Hugh as the most distinguished Newfoundlander of our day".

Family

Hoyles married Jean Liddell (1813-1886), daughter of John Liddell, in 1842. The couple had four children. Hoyles' wife, Jean, died on January 17, 1886, and was buried at Halifax, Nova Scotia. Their son, N. W. Hoyles, Esquire, K.C., lived in Toronto, Ontario.

References

1814 births
1888 deaths
Canadian Anglicans
Premiers of Newfoundland Colony
Politicians from St. John's, Newfoundland and Labrador
Newfoundland Colony judges